Puig is a word of Catalan origin, meaning "hill". Hence, in Catalan-speaking areas, it appears in the names of numerous people and geographical features:

Geographical features
Puig-l'agulla, a mountain of Catalonia
Puig de l'Àliga (Sant Pere de Torelló), a mountain of Catalonia
Puig d'Arques, a mountain of Catalonia
Puig de Bassegoda, a mountain of Catalonia
Puig Campana, a mountain of Alicante, Spain
Puig Castellar (Balenyà), a mountain of Catalonia
Puig Cerverís, a mountain of Catalonia
Puig de la Collada Verda, a mountain of Catalonia
Puig Cornador (Les Llosses), a mountain of Catalonia
Puig Cornador (Ribes de Freser), a mountain of Catalonia
Puig Cornador (Sant Sadurní d'Osormort), a mountain of Catalonia
Puig Cornador (Vilanova de Sau), a mountain of Catalonia
Puig de Dòrria, a mountain of Catalonia
Puig Drau, a mountain of Catalonia
Puig Estela, a mountain of Catalonia
Puig de Fontlletera, a mountain of Catalonia
Puig de Fontnegra, a mountain of Catalonia
Puig Major, the highest mountain peak on the Spanish island of Mallorca
Puig de Massanella, the second highest peak on Mallorca
Puig de la Mola, a mountain of Catalonia
Puig de sa Morisca Archaeological Park, on Mallorca
Puig Neulós, a mountain of Catalonia
Puig de l'Obiol, a mountain of Catalonia
Puig d'Ombriaga, a mountain of Catalonia
Puig de Pastuira, a mountain of Catalonia
Puig de Randa, a mountain peak on Mallorca
Puig-reig, a municipality of Catalonia
Puig Sesarques, a mountain of Catalonia
Puig de la Talaia, a mountain of Catalonia
Puig Tomir, a mountain on Mallorca
El Puig de Santa Maria, a village near the city of Valencia, Spain

People
 Alberto Puig (born 1967), Spanish motorcycle road racer
 Anna Ballbona i Puig (born 1980), Spanish journalist
 Arturo Puig (born 1944), Argentine actor
 Carmen Montoriol Puig (1893–1966), Spanish writer
 Felip Puig (born 1958), Spanish politician
 Fèlix Cardona i Puig (1903–1982),  Venezuelan explorer 
 Herman Puig (born 1928), Cuban photographer
 Isidre Puig Boada (1891–1987), Spanish architect 
 Jack Joseph Puig, music engineer and producer
 Joan Puig i Elias (1898–1972), Catalan pedagogue and anarchist
 Jordi Puig (born 1971), Spanish basketball player
 Jordi Puig-Suari, professor and aerospace technology developer
 José María Cabo Puig (born 1907), Spanish footballer
 José Puig Puig (1922–1997), Spanish footballer
 Josep Puig i Cadafalch (1867–1956), Catalan architect
 Juan Carlos Puig, Secretary of the Treasury of Puerto Rico
 Juan Falconí Puig, Ecuadorian jurist, politician, businessman, university professor and writer
 Lucas Puig (born 1987), French professional skateboarder
 Manny Puig (born 1954), Manny "Sharkman" Puig, American wildlife educator and entertainer
 Manuel Puig (1932–1990), Argentine author
 Mathieu Puig (born 1978), French footballer
 Max Puig (born circa 1946), Dominican politician
 Monica Puig (born 1993), Puerto Rican tennis player
 Pedro Puig Pulido (born 1932), Spanish chess master
 Pere Puig Subinyà (1914–1999), Spanish politician
 Ricardo Álvarez Puig (born 1984), Spanish footballer
 Rich Puig (born 1953), American baseball player
 Robert Aubert Puig, aka Puig Aubert (1925–1994), French rugby league footballer
 Salvador Bécquer Puig (1939–2009), Uruguayan poet and journalist
 Salvador Puig Antich (1948–1974), Spanish anarchist
 Valeria Puig (born 1988), Uruguayan film-maker
 Victoria Puig de Lange (1916–2008), Ecuadorian author, composer, and diplomat
 Yasiel Puig (born 1990), Cuban baseball player
 Riqui Puig (Ricard "Riqui" Puig Martí, born 1999), Spanish footballer

History
 Battle of the Puig, which took place in Valencia in 1237, during the Reconquista

Sport
 CB Puig d'en Valls, a Spanish women's basketball club
 Luis Puig Palace, a sporting arena in Valencia
 Trofeo Luis Puig, a bicycle race held annually in Valencia

Transportation
 Fabra i Puig (Barcelona Metro), a Barcelona Metro station

Business
 Puig (company), international company operating in fashion and perfume sectors

Math
 Puig subgroup, a characteristic subgroup in mathematical finite group theory

See also 
 Le Puy (disambiguation)
 Puy, a geological term used locally in the Auvergne, France for a volcanic hill
 

Catalan-language surnames